Nossa Senhora de Nazaré or da Nazaré may refer to :

 Nossa Senhora da Nazaré, a colonial church in Luanda, Angola
 Nossa Senhora de Nazaré, Piauí, a municipality in the Northeast region of Brazil